Pau Cin Hau is a Unicode block containing characters for the Pau Cin Hau alphabet which was created by Pau Cin Hau, founder of the Laipian religion, to represent his religious teachings.
It was used primarily in the 1930s to write Tedim which is spoken in Chin State, Myanmar.

Block

History
The following Unicode-related documents record the purpose and process of defining specific characters in the Pau Cin Hau block:

References 

Unicode blocks